Samuel E. Lewis (1840 - March 22, 1907) was a Corporal in the Union Army and a Medal of Honor recipient for his actions in the American Civil War.

Medal of Honor citation
Rank and organization: Corporal, Company G, 1st Rhode Island Light Artillery. Place and date: At Petersburg, Va., April 2, 1865. Entered service at: Coventry, R.I. Birth: Coventry, R.I. Date of issue: June 16, 1866.

Citation:

Was one of a detachment of 20 picked artillerymen who voluntarily accompanied an infantry assaulting party and who turned upon the enemy the guns captured in the assault.

See also

List of Medal of Honor recipients
List of American Civil War Medal of Honor recipients: G–L

References

External links

1907 deaths
United States Army Medal of Honor recipients
United States Army soldiers
People of Rhode Island in the American Civil War
People from Coventry, Rhode Island
Year of birth unknown
American Civil War recipients of the Medal of Honor
1840 births